Dino Edgardo Quattrocecere  (born 13 February 1973 in Virginia, Free State) is a South African figure skater. He competed at the 1994 Winter Olympics and placed 24th. He took a break from competitive skating, and then came back to win the South African national title from 2001 through 2003.

Results

External links
 Sports-reference profile
 

1973 births
Living people
People from Matjhabeng Local Municipality
White South African people
South African people of Italian descent
South African male single skaters
Olympic figure skaters of South Africa
Figure skaters at the 1994 Winter Olympics